Elections to North Down Borough Council were held on 5 May 2011 on the same day as the other Northern Irish local government elections. The election used four district electoral areas to elect a total of 25 councillors.

Election results

Note: "Votes" are the first preference votes.

Districts summary

|- class="unsortable" align="centre"
!rowspan=2 align="left"|Ward
! % 
!Cllrs
! % 
!Cllrs
! %
!Cllrs
! %
!Cllrs
! %
!Cllrs
!rowspan=2|TotalCllrs
|- class="unsortable" align="center"
!colspan=2 bgcolor="" | DUP
!colspan=2 bgcolor="" | Alliance
!colspan=2 bgcolor="" | UUP
!colspan=2 bgcolor="" | Green
!colspan=2 bgcolor="white"| Others
|-
|align="left"|Abbey
|bgcolor="#D46A4C"|48.0
|bgcolor="#D46A4C"|4
|14.7
|1
|9.7
|0
|11.5
|0
|16.1
|0
|6
|-
|align="left"|	Ballyholme and Groomsport
|bgcolor="#D46A4C"|37.8
|bgcolor="#D46A4C"|3
|13.7
|1
|12.8
|1
|4.7
|0
|31.0
|2
|7
|-
|align="left"|Bangor West
|bgcolor="#D46A4C"|28.9
|bgcolor="#D46A4C"|2
|17.9
|2
|14.0
|2
|4.3
|0
|34.9
|1
|7
|-
|align="left"|Holywood
|30.6
|2
|bgcolor="#F6CB2F"|31.9
|bgcolor="#F6CB2F"|2
|21.2
|1
|12.0
|0
|4.3
|0
|5
|- class="unsortable" class="sortbottom" style="background:#C9C9C9"
|align="left"| Total
|36.2
|8
|18.3
|6
|13.9
|4
|7.4
|1
|24.2
|3
|25
|-
|}

Districts results

Abbey

2005: 3 x DUP, 2 x UUP, 1 x Alliance
2011: 4 x DUP, 1 x Alliance, 1 x Green
2005-2011 Change: DUP and Green gain from UUP (two seats)

Ballyholme and Groomsport

2005: 2 x DUP, 2 x UUP, 2 x Independent, 1 x Alliance
2011: 3 x DUP, 2 x Independent, 1 x Alliance, 1 x UUP
2005-2011 Change: DUP gain from UUP

Bangor West

2005: 2 x DUP, 2 x UUP, 2 x Alliance, 1 x Green
2011: 2 x DUP, 2 x UUP, 2 x Alliance, 1 x Green
2005-2011 Change: Green becomes Independent

Holywood

2005: 2 x UUP, 2 x Alliance, 1 x DUP
2011: 2 x Alliance, 2 x DUP, 1 x UUP
2005-2011 Change: DUP gain from UUP

References

North Down Borough Council elections
North Down